Unión Deportivo Gijón Industrial is a football team based in Gijón in the autonomous community of Asturias. Founded in 1969, it plays in Tercera División RFEF – Group 2. The club's home ground is Santa Cruz, which has a capacity of 2,500 spectators.

History
Gijón Industrial was founded on 10 July 1969 as a merger between Pelayo CF and Club Calzada, both immersed in a serious economic trouble. The club started playing in Tercera División, when it was composed by inter-provincial groups, being its best season the 1977–78 one, when it finished in the third position of the league table and qualified for the first time to the Copa del Rey.

After a first relegation in the next season, Gijón Industrial came back to Tercera División three season later and four more times the Copa del Rey, before being again relegated to Regional Preferente in 1982. It spent eight seasons in this league before promoting again to Tercera in 1990. After this promotion, the club stays ten consecutive seasons in the fourth tier, the longest streak of the club, before being relegated again.

Since its foundation, the club always alternated Tercera División and Regional Preferente.

Stadium 

Since its foundation, Gijón Industrial plays its games at Estadio Santa Cruz with a capacity for 3,000 people.

The stadium was inaugurated in 1948 and it was owned by Pelayo CF until its merge with Club Calzada in 1969. In 2016, the Town Hall of Gijón renovated the stadium and changed the pitch to one made of artificial turf.

Season to season

35 seasons in Tercera División/Tercera División RFEF

Famous coaches
 Enzo Ferrero
 Nené Ballina

References

External links
Official website 
Futbolme.com profile 

Football clubs in Asturias
Association football clubs established in 1969
1969 establishments in Spain
Sport in Gijón